The Nokia 6310 is a business-oriented mobile phone announced on 15 March 2001 and released at the end of the year as the successor of the Nokia 6210.

This phone was used on the Mercedes-Benz S-Class (W220) (1998-2006 type), where it was held in a cradle and connected to the car's integrated car phone and media system called COMAND APS. It was also Nokia's very first mobile phone with Bluetooth connectivity (version 1.1).

Nokia 6310 (2021) 
On its 20th anniversary, a new mobile phone based on the iconic 6310 design was launched in 2021. The new Nokia 6310 model comes with a comprehensive update over its predecessor with a 2.8" color display, a VGA rear camera and a microSD slot.

References

Mobile phones introduced in 2001
Nokia mobile phones
Mobile phones with infrared transmitter